Macau competed at the 2011 World Aquatics Championships in Shanghai, China between July 16 and 31, 2011.

Diving

Macau has qualified 3 athletes in diving.

Women

Swimming

Macau qualified 3 swimmers.

Men

Women

Synchronised swimming

Macau has qualified 12 athletes in synchronized swimming.

Women

Reserves
Teng Wai Lao
Wa Hei Leong

References

Nations at the 2011 World Aquatics Championships
2011 in Macau sport
Macau at the World Aquatics Championships